Sofrony is a rural locality (a village) in Dvurechenskoye Rural Settlement, Permsky District, Perm Krai, Russia. The population was 44 as of 2010. There are 5 streets.

Geography 
Sofrony is located 19 km southeast of Perm (the district's administrative centre) by road. Novo-Brodovsky is the nearest rural locality.

References 

Rural localities in Permsky District